Marius Mădălin Martac (born 5 July 1991) is a Romanian professional footballer who plays as a right back for Politehnica Iași. In his career, Martac also played for teams such as Chindia Târgoviște, Corona Brașov or Universitatea Cluj, among others.

Honours
Corona Brașov
Liga II: 2012–13
Chindia Târgoviște
Liga II: 2018–19

References

External links
 
 

1991 births
Living people
People from Găești
Romanian footballers
Association football defenders
Liga I players
Liga II players
CSM Corona Brașov footballers
FC Universitatea Cluj players
AFC Chindia Târgoviște players
FC Politehnica Iași (2010) players